Patricia Elizabeth Silva Meléndez (born 1964) is a Chilean teacher and political scientist. She was caretaker minister during the second government of Michelle Bachelet after Jorge Insunza's resignation.

In 2006, she served as director of labour issues during Bachelet's first government (2006−2010).

References

External links
 Profile at Desarrollo y Trabajo

1964 births
Living people
Central University of Chile alumni
21st-century Chilean politicians
Socialist Party of Chile politicians